The Men's Pole Vault event at the 2003 Pan American Games took place on Friday August 8, 2003. Bronze medalist Dominic Johnson won the only medal for Saint Lucia at the 2003 Pan American Games.

Medalists

Records

Results

See also
2003 World Championships in Athletics – Men's pole vault
Athletics at the 2004 Summer Olympics – Men's pole vault

References
Results

Pole Vault, Men
2003